The Pakistan national cricket team toured Sri Lanka in August 2014 to play a two-match Test series against the Sri Lankan national cricket team followed by a three-match series of One Day Internationals (ODI). Sri Lanka won the Test series 2–0 and the ODI series 2–1.

The Test series was the final Test series for Sri Lankan batsmen Mahela Jayawardene after he announced his retirement from Test cricket in order to focus on One Day cricket until the 2015 Cricket World Cup.

In the first innings of the second Test, Sri Lankan bowler Rangana Herath took nine wickets for 127 runs, the best figures for a left-arm bowler in Test cricket.

Squads

Tour matches

One-day: Sri Lanka Cricket Board President's XI  v Pakistanis

Test series

1st Test

2nd Test

ODI series

1st ODI

2nd ODI

3rd ODI

References

External links
 cricinfo
 Hafeez dropped for SL Tests, Younis recalled for ODIs

2014 in Pakistani cricket
2014 in Sri Lankan cricket
2014
International cricket competitions in 2014
Sri Lankan cricket seasons from 2000–01